Chiang Rak is a railway station in the central Thailand, located in Khlong Nueng Sub-District, Khlong Luang District, Pathum Thani Province, outskirts Bangkok.

It is a class 2 railway station  from Hua Lamphong (Bangkok railway station). This station is served by the songthaew (Thai-style minibus) to Thammasat University Rangsit Campus, because it is the closest station to this higher education institution.

Its name "Chiang Rak" comes from its location that was called "Chiang Rak", which is an area in the north of Pathum Thani adjacent to the southern part of Ayutthaya as far as reaching Sing Buri. In the past it was an extensive plain, covering  called "Thung Chiang Rak" (ทุ่งเชียงราก). The word "Chiang Rak" is derived from the fact that in the past it was a place where elephants dragged logs through, locals therefore popularly called "Chang Lak" (ช้างลาก). Later, distorted as Chiang Rak.

The area near the station is also the location of the tenth milestone of Khlong Prem Prachakon, the khlong that was canalized in the reign of King Chulalongkorn (Rama V) from Bangkok to Ayutthaya.

The station was upgraded in 1998 as Thammasat University Rangsit Campus was selected as one of the venues for the 13th Asian Games in the same year. The distinguishing feature of the station is applied Thai-style building complex and A-shaped gables designed in harmony with the logo of the 13th Asian Games.

Train services 
 Rapid No. 111/112 Bangkok–Den Chai–Bangkok
 Ordinary No. 201/202 Bangkok–Phitsanulok–Bangkok
 Ordinary No. 207/208 Bangkok–Nakhon Sawan–Bangkok
 Ordinary No. 209/210 Bangkok–Ban Takhli–Bangkok
 Ordinary No. 212 Taphan Hin–Bangkok 
 Commuter No. 302/303 Bangkok–Lop Buri–Bangkok (no service on weekends and public holidays)
 Commuter No. 313/314 Bangkok–Ban Phachi Junction–Bangkok (no service on weekends and public holidays)
 Commuter No. 317/318 Bangkok–Lop Buri–Bangkok (no service on weekends and public holidays)

References 

Railway stations in Thailand